Giuseppe "Pippo" Cindolo (born 5 August 1945) is an Italian former long-distance runner, third at the 1974 European Athletics Championships on 10000 metres. He was born in Avellino.

Biography
Cindolo has 48 caps in Italy national athletics team (from 1966 to 1976). In his career he participated in two editions of the Olympic Games and won the Italian Athletics Championships 14 times.

Achievements

National titles
Cindolo won the Italian Athletics Championships 14 times: 13 outdoor and one indoor.
Outdoor
2 wins in 5000 metres (1974, 1975)
7 wins in 10000 metres (1969, 1970, 1971, 1972, 1973, 1974, 1975)
3 wins in Marathon (1974, 1975, 1976)
1 win in Half marathon (1974)
1 win in Cross (1965, 1966, 1967, 1968, 1969)
Indoor
1 win in 3000 metres (1971)

See also
 Italy national athletics team - More caps

References

External links
 

1945 births
Living people
Italian male cross country runners
Italian male long-distance runners
Olympic athletes of Italy
Athletes (track and field) at the 1972 Summer Olympics
Athletes (track and field) at the 1976 Summer Olympics
European Athletics Championships medalists
Mediterranean Games bronze medalists for Italy
Athletes (track and field) at the 1967 Mediterranean Games
Athletes (track and field) at the 1971 Mediterranean Games
Universiade medalists in athletics (track and field)
Mediterranean Games medalists in athletics
Universiade bronze medalists for Italy
Medalists at the 1970 Summer Universiade
20th-century Italian people
21st-century Italian people